Leidyula moreleti is a species of air-breathing land slug, shell-less terrestrial pulmonate gastropod mollusk in the family Veronicellidae.

Distribution 
Distribution of Leidyula moreleti include:
 Mexico

This species has not yet become established in the USA, but it is considered to represent a potentially serious threat as a pest, an invasive species which could negatively affect agriculture, natural ecosystems, human health or commerce. Therefore it has been suggested that this species be given top national quarantine significance in the USA.

References

External links

Veronicellidae
Gastropods described in 1871